The Gold Cup is a Grade 3 thoroughbred horse race run over 3200m at Greyville Racecourse in Durban, South Africa. The first running of the race took place in 1920 however it was not run in 1942. The race is considered "Africa’s premier marathon for long-distance runners." The race historically takes place on the last weekend of July, which coincides with the end of the racing season.

This was previously a Grade 1 race, until it was downgraded to a Grade 2 in 2016, and then Grade 3 in 2017.

Most Winners

Jockey Felix Coetzee has won the most Gold Cups with 8. He equalled Charlie Barends record of 7 winners in 1998, before breaking it in 2012.

Past winners

Sponsors

The race is sponsored by Marshalls World of Sport since the 2021 running of the Gold Cup. It is subsequently now called the Marshalls World Of Sport Gold Cup. Previous sponsors include eLAN Property Group (2014-2019), Ladbrokes (2012), Canon (2002-2011), Natal Wholesale Jewellers and Game.

References

Horse races in South Africa
Recurring sporting events established in 1920